The following lists events that happened during 1927 in the Union of Soviet Socialist Republics.

Incumbents
 General Secretary of the Communist Party of the Soviet Union – Joseph Stalin
 Chairman of the Central Executive Committee of the Congress of Soviets – Mikhail Kalinin
 Chairman of the Council of People's Commissars of the Soviet Union – Alexei Rykov

Events

February
 25 February – Article 58 (RSFSR Penal Code) is put into force.

May
 12 May – During the Arcos Affair, British police officers raid the headquarters of ARCOS in London.

December
 2–19 December – 15th Congress of the All-Union Communist Party (Bolsheviks)

Births
 14 January – Ivan Kalita, Olympic equestrian
 16 March – Vladimir Komarov, test pilot and cosmonaut
 23 March – Aleksandr Tarasov, Soviet Olympic modern pentathlete
 31 March – Vladimir Ilyushin, test pilot
 10 April – Alexey Ekimyan, Armenian-Russian composer
 20 April – Mirian Tsalkalamanidze, Olympic wrestler
 15 May – Leila Mardanshina, oil and gas operator (died 2017)
 16 May – Boris Tokarev, Olympic athlete
 28 May – Aleksandr Moiseyev, Olympic basketball player
 3 June – Evgeny Chuprun, painter
 12 June – Timir Pinegin, Olympic sailor (died 2013)
 23 June 
 Leonid Bogdanov, Soviet Olympic fencer
 Galina Rumiantseva, painter
 26 June – Ben Turok, Belarus-born South African anti-apartheid activist, professor and politician (d. 2019)
 28 June – Boris Shilkov, Olympic speed skater
 23 July – Dmitry Buchkin, Soviet painter
 22 August – Aleksandr Tenyagin, football player and manager (died 2008)
 24 August – Levko Lukyanenko, Ukrainian politician (died 2018)
 15 September – Boris Gostev, Soviet Minister of Finance
 1 October – Oleg Yefremov, actor
 27 October – Mikhail Postnikov, mathematician
 28 October – Roza Makagonova, actress
 7 November – Piotr Litvinsky, painter
 12 November – Pavel Kharin, Olympic canoeist
 6 December – Vladimir Naumov, film director
 8 December – Vladimir Shatalov, Soyuz cosmonaut
 14 December – Nikolay Tatarinov, Olympic modern pentathlete

Deaths
 18 May – Nikifor Begichev, Soviet seaman and explorer (born 1874)
 16 June – Károly Vántus, Hungarian Communist Party politician (born 1879)
 16 November – Adolph Joffe, diplomat, committed suicide (born 1883)
 14 December – Julian Sochocki, Russian-Polish mathematician (born 1842)

See also
 1927 in fine arts of the Soviet Union
 List of Soviet films of 1927

References

 
1920s in the Soviet Union
Years in the Soviet Union
Soviet Union
Soviet Union
Soviet Union